Pethia striata is a species of cyprinid fish found in the Tunga River basin  in Karnataka, India.  This species can reach a length of  SL.

References 

Pethia
Fish described in 2015